George V. Grigore (born July 27, 1961) is a Romanian actor, writer, teacher and Doctor in Theater Arts.

Early life
George V. Grigore was born in Scorteni - Jud. Prahova, Romania, on July 27, 1961.  He was the second of two children, with an older sister.  His father was doctor.  According to George's autobiography, he was a mischievous child and enjoyed taking risks;

Present day
George V. Grigore is acting coach at the University Spiru Haret, Faculty of Theater.
He plays the character Scat Man in "Madhouse" film.
In movies he plays the most important characters of the history of being like: Nostradamus, Leonardo da Vinci, Jesus Christ, Rasputin, Pugachov, Hagendorf, John the Apostle and the fiction character like vampire Bruno, Malik The Profet, and many priest and monk characters.

Filmography 
As actor
 They're Watching (2016)  as Village Priest
 Cheia Sol (2015)  (TV Series)  as Matei Manolache 
 Werewolf: The Beast Among Us   (2012)  as Werewolf Hunter
 Coronation Street: Romanian Holiday  (2009) (Video) as Father Balthazar
 Ghouls  (2008) (TV Movie) as Radu
 La urgenţă  (2006)  (TV Series) 
 The Prophecy: Forsaken  (2005) (Video) as Face Licking Throne
 Dracula III: Legacy  (2005) (Video) as Bruno
 Nature Unleashed: Tornado  (2005) (Video) as Malik
 Madhouse  (2004) as Scat Man
 Dark Prince: The True Story of Dracula (2000) (TV Movie) as Orthodox Priest
 Sphinx - Geheimnisse der Geschichte (1999)  (TV Series documentary) as Nostradamus young 
 Timpul liber  (1993) (as Grigore George)

Bibliography
 Apocalipsa
 Meta Tempesta
 Vorbire-Dictiune
 Teatrul. Tentatia realitatii intru realitate

External links
 

1961 births
Living people
Romanian male film actors
Romanian male television actors